Admiral Shepard may refer to:

Alan Shepard (1923–1998), astronaut and U.S. Navy rear admiral
Dwight Shepherd (born c. 1961), U.S. Navy rear admiral
Edwin M. Shepard (1843–1904), U.S. Navy rear admiral